Vinodhini Vaidyanathan is an Indian actress and writer who has mainly worked in Tamil cinema and theatre. She made her debut in A. R. Murugadoss's Engaeyum Eppothum portraying Ananya's sister.  She is best known for her performances in OK Kanmani (2015), Appa (2016), Aandavan Kattalai  (2016),  Ratsasan (2018), Comali (2019), Game Over (2019), Ponmagal Vandhal (2020) and Soorarai Pottru (2020).

Career
Vinodhini made her first film appearance in Priyadarshan's Kanchivaram (2009), after being selected by the director to be a part of the film after he watched her during a performance with the Tamil theatre troupe, Koothu-P-Pattarai. The film won critical acclaim and recognition at the National Film Awards. In early 2010, director Saravanan had watched Vinodhini's solo performance titled Saami Aattam, in which Vinodhini played multiple characters in a 45-minute monologue, and was impressed enough to cast her in his first Tamil film, Engeyum Eppodhum (2011), produced by AR Murugadoss. Her performance in the film as the character of Ananya's sister, was well received.

Since 2011, Vinodhini has appeared in several other films including the comedy Varuthapadatha Valibar Sangam (2013), the horror film Pisaasu (2014) and two collaborations with Mani Ratnam in Kadal (2013) and O Kadhal Kanmani (2015). She also played a significant supporting role as the wife of a gangster in Karthik Subbaraj's Jigarthanda (2014) and in a leading role in Balu Mahendra's Thalaimuraigal (2013), where she played his daughter.

By 2016, Vinodhini started to be recognized for her performances, going on to win Best Performance in a Comedy Role (Female) 2016 at the Ananda Vikatan Cinema Awards for her role in Aandavan Kattalai, as a junior lawyer.

She has also appeared in a few Telugu-language films. Regarding her performance in Crazy Fellow (2022), a critic called her "a revelation".

Vinodhini is also a playwright and theatre director. Her theatre group, Theatre Zero has been actively staging plays since 2012, some of which are Petti Kathaigal, the musical extravaganza "Aayirathoru Iravugal", which she wrote and directed for the prestigious Hindu Theatre Fest in 2016, and Nagercoil Expressum Nadaga Companyum,. which toured extensively in 2016–17. Her play, titled Grand Rehearsal, was the first ever Tamil play to be staged at The Hindu Theatre Fest, which is primarily a festival for English plays from India and abroad. It was declared a laugh riot amid standing ovation from the audience. Similarly, her play Aayirathoru Iravugal, "had the audience roaring with laughter", when it opened in 2016. As of January 2020, Theatre Zero has partnered with stand-up comic Alexander Babu to bring back Vinodhini's play Nagercoil Expressum Nadaga Companyum in its new version and tour with it worldwide.

Vinodhini also writes professionally. Her short stories and articles have been published in Silverscreen.in, The Madras Mag, The News Minute, The Hindu (Tamil) among others.

Personal life
Vinodhini completed her B.Sc. from Ethiraj College for Women, Chennai and went on to do her master's degree in Human Resources Management from XIME, Bangalore. She also holds a second master's degree in Psychology from University of Madras and a PG Diploma in Yoga Therapy from Krishnamacharya Yoga Mandiram.

Filmography

Television 

All television shows are in Tamil, unless otherwise noted.

Television series

References

External links
 

1981 births
Living people
Actresses in Tamil cinema
University of Madras alumni
21st-century Indian actresses
Indian film actresses
Indian stage actresses
Indian women dramatists and playwrights
Tamil dramatists and playwrights
Actresses from Tiruchirappalli
Actresses in Telugu cinema
Actresses in Malayalam cinema